Mount Stahlman is a mountain over  tall, rising at the east flank of Scott Glacier between Mount Wallace and Mount Hamilton, at the west end of the Tapley Mountains in the Queen Maud Mountains. First observed in December 1929 by the Byrd Antarctic Expedition geological party under Laurence Gould. It was visited in December 1934 by the Byrd Antarctic Expedition geological party under Quin Blackburn. It was named by Byrd after James G. Stahlman, a newspaper publisher from Nashville, Tennessee who a supporter of the expedition.

Mountains of the Ross Dependency
Gould Coast